Perilimnia is a genus of flies in the family Sciomyzidae, the marsh flies or snail-killing flies.

Species
P. albifacies Becker, 1919
P. cineritia Zuska, 1969

References

Sciomyzidae
Sciomyzoidea genera
Taxa named by Theodor Becker